Darren Gribben (born 27 March 1986) is a Scottish semi-professional footballer who plays as a striker for Camelon Juniors.

Gribben has played for Hamilton Academical, Cowdenbeath, Forfar Athletic, Stirling Albion, Brechin City, Stranraer, Berwick Rangers, Dumbarton, Bo'ness United and Arbroath.

Career
Gribben broke into Hamilton Academical's first team at the age of 16, making his debut in the Scottish Football League in January 2003 in a match against Stenhousemuir. Gribben was released by the club in August 2004, and he later signed with Cowdenbeath, where he was named the Scottish Football League's Young Player of the Month in January 2012. He joined Forfar Athletic in September 2005, 2007, before being released in April 2007. In May 2007, Gribben was targeted by Elgin City, but signed for Stirling Albion in June 2007, before moving to Berwick Rangers in May 2008. Gribben joined Dumbarton in June 2009, but never appeared for the club, and joined Bo'ness in August 2009. After rejoining Berwick, Gribben spoke publicly about his strike partnership with Craig O'Reilly in September 2010. In July 2011, while still contracted with Berwick, Gribben went on trial with first club Hamilton. In July 2012, Gribben signed for Arbroath alongside Kieran Brennan. 

He was released by Arbroath, April 2013, and returned to Stranraer.

Junior football
By 2016, he was playing for Arthurlie. In 2017, he represented Broxburn Athletic. He later signed for Fauldhouse United.

References

1986 births
Living people
Association football forwards
Scottish footballers
Hamilton Academical F.C. players
Brechin City F.C. players
Stirling Albion F.C. players
Berwick Rangers F.C. players
Cowdenbeath F.C. players
Forfar Athletic F.C. players
Stranraer F.C. players
Arbroath F.C. players
Dumbarton F.C. players
Bo'ness United F.C. players
Broxburn Athletic F.C. players
Camelon Juniors F.C. players.
Blackburn United F.C. players
Livingston United F.C. players
Fauldhouse United F.C. players
Arthurlie F.C. players
Scottish Football League players